Pratikramana (also spelled Pratikraman) (lit. "introspection"), is a ritual during which Jains repent (prayaschit) for their sins and non-meritorious activities committed knowingly or inadvertently during their daily life through thought, speech or action. 

Pratikramana also refers to a combition of six avashyaks (essential rituals), being Samayik (state of total equanimity), Chauvisantho (honoring the 24 Tirthankars), Vandana – (offering salutations to sadhus (monks) and sadhvis (nuns)), Pratikramana (introspection and repentance), Kayotsarga (meditation of the soul) and Pratyakhyan (renunciation).

Although frequency of repenting varies, devout Jains often practice Pratikraman at least twice a day. It is one of the 28 primary attributes (mūla guņa) of both Śvētāmbara and Digambara monks.

Etymology 
Pratikramana is the combination of two words, Pra meaning "return" and
atikramana meaning "violation". Literally, it means "returning from
violations".

Types of Pratikramana
There are five types of Pratikramana:
Devasi
Ray
Pakhi
Chaumasi
Samvatsari

Devasi Pratikraman 
Devasi Pratikramana is performed daily in the evening.

 Rayi Pratikraman 
Rayi Pratikraman is performed in the early morning.

Pakhi Pratikraman
Pakhi Pratikramana is done once every fifteen days. It falls on 15th and 30th dates (sud and vad) of the Hindu calendar month.

Chaumasi Pratikraman
Chaumasi Pratikramana is done once in four months on the Purnima (full moon) of the Kartik, Falgun and Aṣaṛh months of the Vira Nirvana Samvat calendrical year for the sins committed during that period.

 Samvatsari Pratikramana

Samvatsari Pratikraman is done once per year on the last day of Paryushana mahaparv for the sins committed during the whole year. As per holy Jain Agamas, Samvatsari Pratikaman is practiced on the 5th day (sud) of Bhadarva month of the Hindu calendar. 

Samvatsari Pratikraman includes all six things a Śrāvaka (householders) must do:

Overview
Jainism considers the soul, in its pure form, to have infinite perception, knowledge, and vigor, and to be non-attached. These attributes are not seen in a worldly soul because it is soiled with karmas. By following religious principles and activities, Jains believe they overcome karmas and promote liberation of the soul. There are various rituals, of which Pratikraman is the most important. During pratikraman, Jains repent for non-meritorious activities on a daily basis.

Pratikraman must be performed twice every day, or at least once every day after sunset. If that is not possible, at least on every Pakkhi (24 times in a year). If that is not possible, at least one every Chaumasi (3 times in a year). If none of the above is possible a Jain must''' perform at least Samvatsari Pratikraman (once a year).

 Sāmāyika Pratikramana is also done while performing the sāmāyika (periodic concentration). In performing sāmāyika, the śrāvaka has to stand facing north or east and bow to the Pañca-Parameṣṭhi. He then sits down and recites the Namokara mantra a certain number of times, and finally devotes himself to holy meditation. This consists in:pratikramana, recounting the sins committed and repenting for them,pratyākhyanā, resolving to avoid particular sins in future,sāmāyika karma, renunciation of personal attachments, and the cultivation of a feeling of regarding every body and thing alike,stuti, praising the four and twenty Tīrthankaras,vandanā, devotion to a particular Tīrthankaras, andkāyotsarga'', withdrawal of attention from the body (physical personality) and becoming absorbed in the contemplation of the spiritual Self.

Chauvisantho
Chauvisantho, also called Chaturvinshatistava, means adoration of the twenty-four Tirthankaras. While reciting it, Jains show their respect for the Tirthankaras and are reminded of how victorious these Jinas were, who overcame inner enemies like anger, ego, greed, deceit, etc. Chauvisantho encourages Jains to emulate Tirthankars and strive to be like them.

Pratyakhyan
This is a formal renunciation of certain activities, which stops or reduces the inflow of karmas to a great extent. This activity helps us to learn to control our desires and prepares us for a much bigger renunciation.

See also
 Forgiveness in Jainism
 Samvatsari
 Paryushan

References

External links
Jaina.org

Jain philosophical concepts
Jain practices